César Sánchez Domínguez (born 2 September 1971), sometimes known as simply César, is a Spanish retired footballer who played as a goalkeeper.

In 20 La Liga seasons, he played 401 games, with Valladolid, Real Madrid, Zaragoza, Valencia and Villarreal, being first choice in three of those clubs and winning seven major titles with the second, including the 2002 Champions League. He also appeared once for Spain.

From January to June 2020, César was sporting director at Valencia.

Club career

Valladolid and Real Madrid
César was born in Coria, Cáceres, Extremadura. He graduated from Real Valladolid's youth academy, and made his debut with the first team in a 0–6 home defeat against FC Barcelona where he came on for Mauro Ravnić early into the second half, at the end of the 1991–92 season. He only missed a total of four league games between 1995 and 2000.

Sánchez signed in 2000–01 for La Liga giants Real Madrid, initially backing-up wonderkid Iker Casillas. However, the following season, he eventually became first-choice and started five out of nine UEFA Champions League matches during the capital side's victorious campaign, but was substituted by Casillas in the final with Bayer 04 Leverkusen after suffering an injury.

Zaragoza and Tottenham
César joined Real Zaragoza for 2005–06, and was everpresent in the Aragonese side's lineups during three seasons. In August 2008, after their relegation to Segunda División, new manager Marcelino García Toral sent the player to the reserves.

Shortly after, Sánchez was bought by Juande Ramos's Tottenham Hotspur. He made his first and only appearance for the London club in a 4–2 victory over Liverpool in the fourth round of the Football League Cup, replacing injured Heurelho Gomes.

Valencia and later years
César returned to Spain on 20 January 2009, joining Valencia CF on a free transfer until the end of the season as the Che had just lost first-choice Renan to a groin injury, during a 2–3 loss at Athletic Bilbao. Despite this, the former was still named on the bench for a Tottenham game on the 21st, the League Cup semi-final second leg against Burnley; two days later, Tottenham announced that his contract had been cancelled by mutual consent, and he retained his starting status even when the Brazilian recovered from his injury.

After an impressive half-season, César renewed his contract for another year. He started the 2009–10 campaign on the bench, playing second-fiddle to new signing Miguel Ángel Moyá; however, after unconvincing displays by the latter, he regained the starting spot, keeping consecutive clean sheets against Racing de Santander (1–0), defending champions Barcelona (0–0), UD Almería (3–0) and Málaga CF (1–0). In May 2010, after helping Valencia to the third place, with the team consequently returning to the Champions League, the veteran agreed to a further one-year extension.

On 2 April 2011, César became the second oldest goalkeeper in Spanish League history as he appeared – as a starter – in a 4–2 defeat of Getafe CF, aged 39 years and 212 days. He contributed with 15 appearances, as his team finished third and qualified to the Champions League.

However, after the club acquired Diego Alves and renewed youth graduate Vicente Guaita's contract, César became surplus to requirements. On 2 June 2011, he signed a one-year deal with Valencian Community neighbours Villarreal CF, making his league debut on 10 September in a 2–2 home draw against Sevilla FC: after replacing sent off Diego López early into the first half, he stopped the ensuing penalty by Álvaro Negredo, whom however managed to score with a putback. Subsequently, he became only the fifth player to appear in a Spanish top division match over the age of 40, following Harry Lowe, Jacques Songo'o, Amedeo Carboni and Donato.

César returned to the Mestalla Stadium on 20 January 2020, being appointed sporting director on a two-and-a-half-year contract. However, five months later, he resigned from the post.

International career
César earned his first and only cap for Spain on 16 August 2000, in a 4–1 friendly defeat to Germany in Hannover.

Honours
Real Madrid
La Liga: 2000–01, 2002–03
Supercopa de España: 2001, 2003
UEFA Champions League: 2001–02
Intercontinental Cup: 2002
UEFA Super Cup: 2002

See also
 List of La Liga players (400+ appearances)
 List of Real Zaragoza players (+100)

References

External links
 
 

1971 births
Living people
People from Vegas del Alagón
Sportspeople from the Province of Cáceres
Spanish footballers
Footballers from Extremadura
Association football goalkeepers
La Liga players
Segunda División B players
Real Valladolid Promesas players
Real Valladolid players
Real Madrid CF players
Real Zaragoza players
Valencia CF players
Villarreal CF players
Tottenham Hotspur F.C. players
UEFA Champions League winning players
Spain international footballers
Spanish expatriate footballers
Expatriate footballers in England
Spanish expatriate sportspeople in England
Valencia CF non-playing staff